Hardfloor is a German electronic music duo, consisting of Oliver Bondzio and Ramon Zenker. Their most famous track is "Acperience 1" (often titled more simply as "Acperience" on many compilation albums) and chosen by Feargal Sharkey as one of his 'Inheritance Tracks' when interviewed on UK's BBC Radio 4.

Their distinctive acid house sound is attributed to their skill at manipulating Roland TB-303 bass synthesisers, using up to six of these machines at once. Their UK chart hits include "Hardtrance Acperience" (1992), "Trancescript" (1993) and the remix of the  aforementioned "Acperience" (1997). Their 1996 album, Home Run, peaked at No. 68 in the UK Albums Chart.

Discography

Albums

Da Damn Phreak Noize Phunk 
Hardfloor also released albums under the pseudonym Da Damn Phreak Noize Phunk.  These songs tend toward the chillout and lounge genres.

Mix albums compiled by Hardfloor

Singles and EPs

Selected Hardfloor remixes
 Robert Armani - "Circus Bells" 1993 Djax-Up-Beats
 Rising High Collective - "Fever Called Love" 1993 Rising High Records
 Sourmash - "Pilgrimage To Paradise" 1994 Prolekult Records
 Mory Kante - "Yé ké yé ké" 1995 FFRR Records
 Mary Kiani - "When I Call Your Name" 1995 Mercury Records
 Bassheads - "Is There Anybody Out There?" 1995 Deconstruction Records (Desa Basshead)
 New Order - "Blue Monday" 1995 London Records
 Baby Doc And The Dentist - Mantra To The Buddha 1995 TEC (Truelove Electronic Communications)
 TWA - "Nasty Girls" 1995 Mercury Records
 The Shamen - "Destination Eschaton" 1995 Epic Records
 Depeche Mode - "It's No Good" 1997 Mute Records

References

External links
 hardfloor.de - official website
 [ Hardfloor] at Allmusic
  Hardfloor - Hardfloor's Myspace-site
 
 Hardfloor discography Unofficial Hardfloor Discography
 Our Acid Experience 2006 - Hardfloor at eMusic
 
 Hardfloor at Last.fm

Electronic music duos
German electronic music groups
Remixers
German musical duos